The 1976 Omloop Het Volk was the 31st edition of the Omloop Het Volk cycle race and was held on 6 March 1976. The race started and finished in Ghent. The race was won by Willem Peeters.

General classification

References

1976
Omloop Het Nieuwsblad
Omloop Het Nieuwsblad